Show No Mercy is the debut studio album by American thrash metal band Slayer, released in December 1983, by Metal Blade Records. Brian Slagel signed the band to the label after watching them perform the song "Phantom of the Opera" by Iron Maiden. The band self-financed their full-length debut, combining the savings of vocalist Tom Araya, who was employed as a respiratory therapist, and money borrowed from guitarist Kerry King's father. Touring extensively promoting the album, the band brought close friends and family members along the trip, who helped backstage with lighting and sound.

Although the album was criticized for its poor production quality, it became Metal Blade's highest-selling release, producing the songs "The Antichrist", "Die by the Sword" and "Black Magic", which were played at Slayer's live shows regularly.

Recording
Slayer was the opening act for Bitch at the Woodstock Club in Los Angeles, performing eight songs—six being covers. While performing an Iron Maiden cover, the band was spotted by Brian Slagel, a former music journalist who had recently founded Metal Blade Records. Slagel met with the band backstage and asked if they would like to be featured on the label's upcoming Metal Massacre III compilation; the band agreed. The band's appearance on the compilation created underground buzz, which led to Slagel signing the band with Metal Blade Records. Recorded in Los Angeles, California, Show No Mercy was financed by vocalist Tom Araya, who used his earnings as a respiratory therapist, and money borrowed from guitarist Kerry King's father. King says the album is "fuckin' Iron Maiden here and there". Vocalist Araya asserts Venom, Judas Priest, Iron Maiden, and Mercyful Fate were big influences on the record, as guitarist King was into the Satanic image.

Gene Hoglan, later known as the drummer for bands like Dark Angel and Death, provided backing vocals on the song "Evil Has No Boundaries". "Back at the time it was Jeff [Hanneman] and Kerry doing the 'Evil!' You know, it didn't sound too heavy and I mentioned to like Tom or Jeff or somebody like, 'You know you guys should consider...maybe consider doing like big gang vocals on that, make it sound evil like demons and stuff,' and they were like 'Good idea.' But how about now, we got about eight dudes sitting around in the studio, and now everybody jumped up and yelled 'EVIL!!!' So I was like 'Cool' because I'm like, 'I wanna sing on this record somehow, that's how I can do it,' totally unplanned you know?! Sure enough they were like, 'Fuck we have the time, let's do it.' So I was like 'Yeah, I got to sing on it!'" On recording the drums, Slagel wanted drummer Dave Lombardo to play without using cymbals due to the amount of noise they made, as he was unsure if he could siphon the noise out, which he eventually did.

The band used Satanic themes in both lyrics and live performances to gain notice among the metal community. The back cover featured 'side 666' and inverted crosses, with Hanneman playing his guitar. Due to the imagery and lyrical content, Slayer received mail from the Parents Music Resource Center telling the band to stop releasing records.  Araya comments, "Back then you had that PMRC, who literally took everything to heart. When in actuality you're trying to create an image. You're trying to scare people on purpose." The album produced the songs "The Antichrist", "Die by the Sword", and "Black Magic", which were played at Slayer's live shows regularly.

Touring
The band went on their first tour of the United States after the album's release—Slagel gave the band a list of addresses and contact numbers of the venues. Araya was still working at the hospital, and called the members saying, "Today's the day. Are we gonna do this?" The band knew if they did not tour now, they never would. So they set out taking Araya's Camaro and U-Haul. During the first leg of the tour, Slayer had no manager; Doug Goodman, who had met the band when he was first in line for their first show in Northern California (opening for Lȧȧz Rockit) took a vacation from his job at a grocery store to help out on the tour, eventually becoming the band's "tour guide". Goodman now tour manages acts such as Green Day and Beck.

Kevin Reed, a friend of the band, set up the drums and lighting when touring with the band. Reed's father, Lawrence R. Reed, drew the Minotaur with a sword on the album's cover. Araya's younger brother, Johnny Araya, who was thirteen or fourteen at the time, was a roadie who set up the back line and sound. The band hardly made enough money to sustain themselves, only buying the "essentials" such as food, gas, and beer. Araya asserts, "We basically used whatever money we got to get from point A to point B. When we got back, Brian was like, 'So, where's the money?' And we were like, 'What money?' At that time, we didn't realize that you had to ask for money up front. I think he got a lot of money sent directly to him, and we were supposed to pick up the rest."

The band performed in a hotel in Winnipeg, where the basement was the club. Araya comments, "We stayed there for like four or five days, I think. We saw Verbal Abuse play there. Then we played a place in Boston called the Lizard Lounge. In fact, a car had run into the front of the building, and it was all boarded up, but we still played there." When one of the guitarists broke a string Araya would hand them the bass, Hanneman stating, "We'd argue about it, too—like, 'I wanna play bass for a while!'"

Reception

Although the band did not have enough time to sell any records while touring, the album became Metal Blade Records' highest selling release. Five thousand copies was the label's average. Show No Mercy went on to sell between 15,500 and 20,000 copies in the United States; it also went on to sell more than 15,000 overseas, as Metal Blade had worldwide rights. The success of the album led to Slagel wanting the band to release a new record and an extended play.

Show No Mercy was met with polarized opinions when it was issued, but in some recent reviews it came to be considered a classic album. In 1984, Dave Dickson of Kerrang! crushed the album defining it "pure, unadulterated junk", while Bernard Doe of Metal Forces called the record "one of the heaviest, fastest, most awesome albums of all time!" The German magazine Rock Hard gave Show No Mercy a positive review, which remarked how Slayer were "actually the hardest and fastest" in comparison with their contemporaries Metallica and Exciter, and defined their music as "heavy metal punk." AllMusic reviewer Jeremy Ulrey had mixed feelings towards the album, saying that even though the musicianship and production were "amateurish" compared to Slayer's later releases, the album remains "solid, if inessential, part of the Slayer legacy". Users voted 4/5 at AllMusic. Sputnikmusic staff member Hernan M. Campbell described the album as "fast, heavy, and mean, inducing an inescapable atmosphere of utter atrocity." He noted that the "lo-fi" production quality gives the album a "classic" feeling.

Canadian journalist Martin Popoff praised Show No Mercy for being as "seminal" as Metallica's Kill 'Em All "in defining state-of-the-art speed metal" and for inspiring new bands to "expand the limits of metal." However, he "found the record stiff and one dimensional", with "its style laid down in stifling arrangements." Fenriz, drummer for Darkthrone, cited Show No Mercy as the inspiration for the band's "current style of fusing NWOBHM with black metal". Terry Butler of Obituary and former member of Death defined the album as "the blueprint for the beginning of death metal" and said: "When I heard Show No Mercy I wanted to play that way....It was a whole new level of mayhem. I wanted to play that way".

System of a Down's Daron Malakian has praised Show No Mercy as an influential album that helped shaped him as a person and artist. He claimed he introduced Heavy Metal with this album to Iraq when he lived there at age 14.

Track listing

The 1987 re-issue also features songs from the Haunting the Chapel EP.

Personnel

Slayer
 Tom Araya – bass, vocals
 Kerry King – guitars
 Jeff Hanneman – guitars
 Dave Lombardo – drums

Production
Brian Slagel – executive production
Bill Metoyer – engineering, mixing

Charts

References

Slayer albums
1983 debut albums
Metal Blade Records albums